Nampa/Hockey Aerodrome  is located  south of Nampa, Alberta, Canada.

References

Registered aerodromes in Alberta
Northern Sunrise County